Antimony pentoxide (molecular formula: Sb2O5) is a chemical compound of antimony and oxygen. It contains antimony in the +5 oxidation state.

Structure
Antimony pentoxide has the same structure as the B form of niobium pentoxide and can be derived from the rutile structure, with antimony coordinated by six oxygen atoms in a distorted octahedral arrangement. The SbO6 octahedra are corner- and edge-sharing.

Preparation
The hydrated oxide is prepared by hydrolysis of antimony pentachloride; or by acidification of potassium hexahydroxoantimonate(V).  It may also be prepared by oxidation of antimony trioxide with nitric acid.

Uses
Antimony pentoxide finds use as a flame retardant in ABS and other plastics and as a flocculant in the production of titanium dioxide, and is sometimes used in the production of glass, paint and adhesives.

It is also used as an ion exchange resin for a number of cations in acidic solution including Na+ (especially for their selective retentions), and as a polymerization and oxidation catalyst.

Properties and reactions
The hydrated oxide is insoluble in nitric acid, but dissolves in a concentrated potassium hydroxide solution to give potassium hexahydroxoantimonate(V), or KSb(OH)6.

Heating to  produces a white, insoluble powder of Sb2O4 in both α and β forms. The β form consists of antimony(V) in octahedral interstices and pyramidal SbIIIO4 units. In these compounds, the antimony(V) atom is octahedrally coordinated to six hydroxy groups.

The pentoxide can be reduced to antimony metal by heating with hydrogen or potassium cyanide.

References

Oxides
Antimony(V) compounds